The 2002 European Figure Skating Championships was a senior international figure skating competition in the 2001–02 season. Medals were awarded in the disciplines of men's singles, ladies' singles, pair skating, and ice dancing. The event was held at the Malley Ice Rink in Lausanne, Switzerland from January 14 to 20, 2002.

The first compulsory dance was the Ravensburger Waltz and the second was the Blues.

Qualifying
The competition was open to skaters from European ISU member nations who had reached the age of 15 before 1 July 2001. The corresponding competition for non-European skaters was the 2002 Four Continents Championships. National associations selected their entries based on their own criteria. Based on the results of the 2001 European Championships, each country was allowed between one and three entries per discipline.

Medals table

Competition notes
Due to the large number of participants, the men's and ladies' qualifying groups were split into groups A and B.

Results

Men

Ladies

Pairs

Ice dancing

References

External links
 2002 European Figure Skating Championships
 https://www.telegraph.co.uk/sport/othersports/iceskating/2428561/Ice-Skating-Way-clear-without-Plushenkos-wiggle.html
 https://web.archive.org/web/20120324011650/http://ww2.isu.org/news/europe1.html
 https://web.archive.org/web/20120324011659/http://ww2.isu.org/news/europe2.html
 https://web.archive.org/web/20120324011703/http://ww2.isu.org/news/europe3.html
 https://web.archive.org/web/20120324011713/http://ww2.isu.org/news/europe4.html
 https://web.archive.org/web/20120324011720/http://ww2.isu.org/news/europe5.html
 https://web.archive.org/web/20120324011724/http://ww2.isu.org/news/europe6.html

European Figure Skating Championships, 2002
European Figure Skating Championships, 2002
European Figure Skating Championships
Figure skating in Switzerland
International figure skating competitions hosted by Switzerland
Sports competitions in Lausanne
21st century in Lausanne
January 2002 sports events in Europe